Cognitive-cultural economy or cognitive-cultural capitalism is represented by sectors such as high-technology industry, business and financial services, personal services, the media, the cultural industries. It is characterized by digital technologies combined with high levels of cognitive and cultural labor.

Overview
The concept of cognitive-cultural economy has been associated with 'post-Fordism', the 'knowledge economy', the 'new economy' and highly flexible labor markets.

As Fordist mass production began to wane after the mid to late 1970s in advanced capitalist countries, a more flexible system of productive activity began to take its place. The concept of cognitive-cultural capitalism has developed as a response to the insufficiency of the interpretations of this transition from a Fordist to a post-Fordist model of "flexible accumulation. Early empirical studies of this new system were published in the 1980s on the basis of case-study materials focused mainly on high-technology industrial districts in the United States (Silicon Valley, Orange County, Boston's Route 128, etc.—see Saxenian) and revived craft industries in the north-east and center of Italy (the so-called Third Italy). Over the following decades, considerable empirical and theoretical advances were made on the basis of studies of the new cultural economy (fashion, film, electronic games, publishing, etc.).

Levy and Murnane in The New Division of Labor highlight the replacement of standardized machinery in the American production system by digital technologies that not only act as a substitute for routine labor, but that also complement and enhance the intellectual and affective assets of the labor force. These technologies underpinned an enormous expansion of the technology-intensive, service, financial, craft, and cultural industries that became the heart of the cognitive-cultural economy.

See also 
Creative industries
Financial services
General intellect
High-technology industry
Operaismo
Postfordism
Purple economy
Regulation school

References

Further reading 
 Amin, A., ed. 1994. Post-Fordism: A Reader. Oxford: Blackwell.
 Bilsker, R. 2015. "What is this Thing?" ephemera, 15 (2): 477-486
 Cenzatti, M. 1993. Los Angeles and the L.A. School: Postmodernism and Urban Studies. Los Angeles: Los Angeles Forum for Architecture and Urban Design.
 Fumagalli, A. & Lucarelli, S. 2007. A model of Cognitive Capitalism: a preliminary analysis, European Journal of Economic and Social Systems, vol. 20, n. 1.
 Hutton, T. A. 2008. The New Economy of the Inner City: Restructuring, Regeneration, and Dislocation in the Twenty-First Century Metropolis. London: Routledge.
 Kloosterman, R. C. 2010. This Is Not America: Embedding The Cognitive-Cultural Urban Economy. Geografiska Annaler Series B-Human Geography 92B (2):131-143.
 Moulier Boutang, Y. 2007. Le Capitalisme Cognitif, Comprendre la Nouvelle Grande Transformation et ses Enjeux. Paris: Editions Amsterdam.
 Pasquinelli, M. 2014. Italian Operaismo and the Information Machine, Theory, Culture & Society, first published on February 2, 2014.
 Pavlidis, P. 2012. The Rise of General Intellect and the Meaning of Education: Reflections on the Contradictions of Cognitive Capitalism. Journal for Critical Education Policy Studies. 10 (1): 37–52.
 Saxenian, A. L. 1983. The urban contradictions of Silicon Valley - regional growth and the restructuring of the semiconductor industry. International Journal of Urban And Regional Research 7 (2):237-262.
 Scott, A. J. 2008. Social Economy of the Metropolis: Cognitive-Cultural Capitalism and the Global Resurgence of Cities. Oxford: Oxford University Press.
 Scott, A. J. 2010. Cultural Economy and the Creative Field of the City. Geografiska Annaler, Series B - Human Geography.
 Vercellone, C. 2005. The Hypothesis of Cognitive Capitalism. Working Paper Presented at Birkbeck College and SOAS, United Kingdom.
 Trebor Scholz, 2013 Digital Labor: New Opportunities, Old Inequalities. Conference at re:publica
Rindermann H. 2012. Intellectual classes, technological progress and economic development: The rise of cognitive capitalism. Personality and Individual Differences 53 (2) 108–113

Capitalism
Cultural economics